Siniša Mulina (born 7 February 1973) is a Bosnian retired footballer.

Club career
Mulina started his senior career at top Serbian league club FK Bečej. Next he moved to FK Partizan where he played one season and won the First League of FR Yugoslavia in 1996-97. Next season he moved to FK Milicionar and in 2001 had a brief spell with FK Vojvodina. Then, he moved to First League of the Republika Srpska, where he was spotted by FK Leotar. He played for Leotar in every Bosnian Premier League since 2002, except in 2005 when signed by defending champion HŠK Zrinjski Mostar. He played for Zrinjski in 2005–06 UEFA Champions League qualifiers. He later played with Leotar between 2005 and 2008.  He had a short spell in 2008-09 with NK GOŠK Dubrovnik in the Croatian 3. HNL, before finishing his career with Leotar in 2009–10.

International career
He made his debut for Bosnia and Herzegovina in a September 2002 European Championship qualification match against Romania and has earned a total of 3 caps, scoring no goals. His final international was an April 2003 European Championship qualification match away against Denmark.

Coaching career
By June 2015 he was the coach of FK Leotar U18 team.

Honours
Partizan
First League of FR Yugoslavia: 1996-97
Leotar
Premier League of Bosnia and Herzegovina: 2003

References

External links

 
 

1973 births
Living people
Association football midfielders
Bosnia and Herzegovina footballers
Bosnia and Herzegovina international footballers
OFK Bečej 1918 players
FK Partizan players
FK Milicionar players
FK Vojvodina players
FK Leotar players
HŠK Zrinjski Mostar players
NK GOŠK Dubrovnik players
Bosnia and Herzegovina expatriate footballers
First League of Serbia and Montenegro players
Second League of Serbia and Montenegro players
Premier League of Bosnia and Herzegovina players
Second Football League (Croatia) players
Expatriate footballers in Serbia and Montenegro
Bosnia and Herzegovina expatriate sportspeople in Serbia and Montenegro
Expatriate footballers in Croatia
Bosnia and Herzegovina expatriate sportspeople in Croatia
Bosnia and Herzegovina football managers